West High School (1908–1982) was a public high school in Minneapolis, Minnesota. Edward Stebbins designed the school building. Built in 1908 on what had recently been farmland, the school had a student capacity of 1,600 by 1917. Minneapolis Public Schools closed Central, West and Marshall-University high schools in 1982.

Notable alumni
James Arness, actor
Curt Carlson, businessman
Peter Edelman, lawyer, educator, government official
George A. French, lawyer and Minnesota state legislator
Tippi Hedren, actress
Alexander Kreiser, aviator and brigadier general
Emery "Swede" Larson, football coach and Marine Corps officer
C. Walton Lillehei, surgeon
Fancy Ray McCloney, stand-up comedian 
Henrietta Mears, Christian educator and evangelist 
Mary Ellen Pinkham, humor columnist and author
Dave Pirner, Soul Asylum
Harry Reasoner, journalist and broadcaster
Arnulf Ueland, Minnesota state senator and businessman

References

High schools in Minneapolis
Defunct schools in Minnesota
Educational institutions established in 1908
1908 establishments in Minnesota
1982 disestablishments in Minnesota